John Augustus Charles Harrison (1872–1955) was a noted British stamp engraver whose work included the British Seahorse stamps of 1913.

In 1963, Harrison's son donated a collection of mostly British and British Commonwealth die proofs engraved by J.A.C. Harrison between 1911 and 1937 to the British Museum and it today forms part of the British Library Philatelic Collections.

Biography
John Augustus Charles Harrison was born in Manchester on the 5th of August 1872. He was the son of line-engraver, Samuel Harrison, and the grandson of John Harrison, a heraldic painter. Two of John’s three brothers, Thomas and Wilfred, were also engravers.

John A.C. Harrison was apprenticed to his father at the age of thirteen, while he attended art classes in Birmingham. At seventeen, Harrison joined the firm of Waterlow Brothers and Layton as an ornamental engraver. By the end of the century, however, Harrison had left their employment and was working as a self-employed engraver. He specialised in the design and production of line-engraved heraldic bookplates, which gained him a wide reputation for his skills. Alongside his career as an engraver, Harrison was also a competent water-colourist and was interested in the stage.

Harrison was commissioned by the Royal Mint to engrave the dies of several postage stamps, upon the death of King Edward VII in 1910. He became known for his mastery of both relief-engraving and line-engraving, which was only matched by Ferdinand Schirnbock (1859-1930).

John A.C. Harrison passed away in 1954. His son has since donated many of the British and Commonwealth die proofs engraved by John A.C. Harrison from 1911 to 1937 to the British Museum in London, where it forms a part of the British Library Philatelic Collections.

References

19th-century engravers
20th-century engravers
British engravers
Harrison
1872 births
1954 deaths
Artists from Manchester
20th-century British printmakers